Sangervaara is a village and hill (398 meters high) in the Swedish municipality Gällivare.

Populated places in Gällivare Municipality